Derick Osei Yaw (born 10 September 1998) is a French professional footballer. He plays as a striker and most recently played for Scottish side Dundee.

Club career

Early career
On 30 January 2019, Osei signed for Stade Brestois 29 on a two-year contract, joining from Toulouse FC. He made his professional debut for Brest in a 1–1 Ligue 2 tie with Gazélec Ajaccio on 15 February 2019.

Oxford United
On 21 August 2020, Osei Yaw signed with English club Oxford United on a two-year contract. He made his debut for the club on 5 September as a late substitute in an EFL Cup tie against AFC Wimbledon, which Oxford won 4–3 on penalties after the game finished 1–1. On 8 September, he scored his first goal for the club in a 2–1 win over Chelsea U21s in an EFL Trophy tie, and on 10 November 2020 he scored the winning goal as Oxford beat League Two side Walsall 0–1 to go through to the knockout stages of the same competition. On 1 February 2021, Osei Yaw joined Walsall on loan for the remainder of the 2020–21 season. On 2 September 2021, Osei Yaw left Oxford by mutual consent.

AFC Wimbledon
On 19 March 2022, Osei signed for EFL League One side AFC Wimbledon on a short-term contract until the end of the 2021–2022 season. He departed the Dons at the end of the season.

Dundee 
On 6 October 2022, Osei signed for Scottish Championship side Dundee until the end of the season. Osei made his debut off the bench in a Scottish League Cup game against Rangers. Osei scored his first goal for the Dark Blues on 28 October, scoring a late equaliser against Queen's Park. He would net two goals coming off the bench in a 6–2 Scottish Cup win over Airdrieonians the following month. On 16 January 2023, Osei left Dundee after the club activated a break clause in his contract.

International career
Born in France, Osei Yaw is of Ghanaian descent. Osei Yaw is a youth international for France, and represented the U20s at the 2017 Toulon Tournament.

Career statistics

References

External links

1998 births
Living people
Footballers from Toulouse
French footballers
France youth international footballers
French sportspeople of Ghanaian descent
Association football wingers
Toulouse FC players
Oxford United F.C. players
Walsall F.C. players
AFC Wimbledon players
English Football League players
Stade Brestois 29 players
AS Béziers (2007) players
Ligue 2 players
Championnat National players
Championnat National 3 players

French expatriate sportspeople in Scotland
Scottish Professional Football League players
Dundee F.C. players